Begoña García Grau (born 19 July 1995) is a Spanish field hockey player who plays as a forward for Club de Campo and the Spanish national team. She competed in the 2016 Summer Olympics.

References

External links
 

1995 births
Living people
Spanish female field hockey players
Olympic field hockey players of Spain
Field hockey players at the 2016 Summer Olympics
Field hockey players at the 2020 Summer Olympics
Sportspeople from Zaragoza
Female field hockey forwards
Club de Campo Villa de Madrid players